Donauwörth station is a railway station in southern Germany. It is located south-west of the city of Donauwörth in Bavaria. The station is at the intersection of the Nuremberg–Augsburg line and the Ingolstadt–Neuoffingen railway from Ulm to Regensburg. The Ries Railway also runs from Donauwörth to Aalen.

History 

The first train ran to Donauwörth in 1847. The station was located at that time in an area now occupied by a street called Promenade, one kilometre closer to the city centre than the present station. In 1861, a railway siding was built from this station to serve steam shipping on the Danube in the area of the modern Zirgesheimer Straße. The station was located directly next to a former 125 metre long railway tunnel. The tunnel is now usable by pedestrians and cyclists. During the Second World War, it was used for the manufacture of war munitions.
 
The railway from Neuoffingen to Regensburg was opened in 1877. This crossed the existing line to Augsburg in Donauwörth. Therefore, the present Donauwörth station was built, from 1874 to 1877, in the southwest of the city and it was opened on 15 November 1877. In the Second World War Donauwörth station was destroyed in air attacks on 11 and 19 April 1945. It was reconstructed from 1948 to 1953. In 2001, the station forecourt was redesigned as a bus station.

Operations

Long distance 
The Donauwörth station is served several times daily by Intercity-Express and InterCity services on the line from Munich via Nuremberg and Berlin to Hamburg. Furthermore, there are numerous services to Munich. On Sundays there is an InterCity service to Flensburg via Donauwörth.

Regional services 
In Donauwörth, Regionalbahn services intersect on the Ries Railway to Aalen, the Danube Valley Railway from Ulm to Regensburg and the line from Augsburg to Nuremberg. Since the commissioning of the high-speed line from Munich to Nuremberg via Ingolstadt some Intercity-Express services have been discontinued and replaced by Regional-Express services, creating a direct connection to Nuremberg. In the opposite direction the Allgäu-Franken-Express creates a through service to Lindau and Oberstdorf. The long-planned Fugger-Express was introduced on the Munich–Augsburg–Donauwörth–Aalen route at the timetable change on 13 December 2009. This means that almost all regional services to Augsburg continue to Munich.

Facilities 
The station has a ticket office, Service Store, book store and waiting room. Next to the station there is a car park for rail passengers and bike racks.

Project 
The city of Donauwörth seeks to modernise and improve the accessibility of the station by the installation of lifts on all platforms. This is estimated to cost €3.2 to 3.7 million and sources of finance are not yet clear. Another project that has long been pursued, however, is the extension of the railway underpass to the south side of the station on Industriestraße. This would improve access to the Eurocopter plant.

Notes

External links 
 
 

Railway stations in Bavaria
Railway stations in Germany opened in 1877
Buildings and structures in Donau-Ries
1877 establishments in Bavaria